Sasi Sintawee (born May 20, 1995) is a Thai beauty queen and the official representative of Thailand to the environmentally dedicated pageant, Miss Earth 2014 pageant.

Pageantry

Miss Grand Thailand 2014
Sasi joined the Miss Grand Thailand pageant where the winners will be competing in different pageants internationally. She was able to get the first runner-up and gained the right to represent Thailand at Miss Earth 2014. She was crowned by Miss Earth-Air 2013, Katia Wagner. The winner, Miss Earth 2013, Alyz Henrich, was supposed to go there and grace the said event but it was postpones because of her health.

After winning, Sasi promoted the cause of Miss Earth in Thailand. She, together with Katia Wagner, promoted the campaign of collecting trash in the bin in order to reduce the amount of miss trashing and also the trash sorting campaign. They also promoted the campaign to Bangkok citizens and tourists for using more bicycle commute around inner area of Bangkok as well using more mass transit instead of personal car to reduce the traffic and pollution problem in Bangkok business area.

Sasi also promotes her activity which is called "Save the World" campaign which enabled her to promote the prevention of water pollution, proper waste management disposal and fire prevention.

As part of her prizes, Sasi, together with other Miss Grand Thailand winners, traveled to the Philippines to have an intensive training as part of their preparations for their participation in their respective international pageants. While in the Philippines, Sasi was able to meet Miss Philippines Earth 2014, Jamie Herrell.

Miss Earth 2014
By award first runner up at Miss Grand Thailand 2014, Sasi took the right of Miss Earth Thailand title, Sasi will flew to the Philippines in November to compete with almost 100 other candidates to be Alyz Henrich's successor as Miss Earth.

As the pageant concluded, Sasi was declared as part of the top 16 semifinalists. However, she was not able to make it through to the next round. The Miss Earth 2014 pageant was won by Jamie Herrell of the Philippines.

References

External links
Sasi Sintawee at Miss Grand Thailand official website
Miss Earth official website

Living people
Miss Earth 2014 contestants
Sasi Sintawee
Miss International 2015 delegates
1994 births

Miss International Thailand